The 2008 Internazionali Femminili di Palermo was a women's tennis tournament played on outdoor clay courts. It was the 21st edition of the Internazionali Femminili di Palermo, and was part of the Tier IV Series of the 2008 WTA Tour. It took place in Palermo, Italy, from July 7 through July 13, 2008.

Champions

Singles

 Sara Errani defeated  Mariya Koryttseva, 6–2, 6–3
It was Sara Errani's 1st career title.

Doubles

 Sara Errani /  Nuria Llagostera Vives defeated  Alla Kudryavtseva /  Anastasia Pavlyuchenkova, 2–6, 7–6(7–1), 10–4

External links
Official website
Singles, Doubles and Qualifying Singles Draws

Internazionali Femminili di Palermo
2008
2008 in Italian women's sport
Torneo